Jeremy Wright (born 1972) is an English politician.

Jeremy Wright may also refer to:

Jeremy Wright (actor) in Adoration (film)
Jeremy Wright, running back in 2011 Louisville Cardinals football team
Jeremy Wright, musician in The Sundance Kids

See also
Jerry Wright (disambiguation)